Clarence Dickson "Lefty" Russell (July 8, 1890 – January 22, 1962) was an American professional baseball player who played three seasons for the Philadelphia Athletics from  through . He was on Athletics teams that won two World Series in 1910 and 1911, although according to the 1912 Reach guide he was "no use at all, owing to a bad arm" in 1911.  He was born in Baltimore, Maryland and died there at the age of 71.

References

External links

1890 births
1962 deaths
Major League Baseball pitchers
Philadelphia Athletics players
Newark Bears (IL) players
Baseball players from Baltimore